The 1972 Belgian Grand Prix was a Formula One motor race held at Nivelles on 4 June 1972. It was race 5 of 12 in both the 1972 World Championship of Drivers and the 1972 International Cup for Formula One Manufacturers. The 85-lap race was won by Lotus driver Emerson Fittipaldi after he started from pole position. François Cevert finished second for the Tyrrell team and McLaren driver Denny Hulme came in third.

Reigning World Champion Jackie Stewart was a notable absence – his gruelling schedule of racing in Formula 1, Can-Am and European touring cars, plus promotional events for Tyrrell sponsors Elf and Ford, as well as a sideline of sports commentating on television in the US led to what was originally diagnosed as an ulcer, but was later confirmed as gastritis. Under doctor's orders, he took about three weeks off from everything, canceled his involvement with the Can-Am series and US TV for the remainder of 1972, and was restricting his schedule of everything else.

Qualifying

Qualifying classification

Race

Classification

Championship standings after the race

Drivers' Championship standings

Constructors' Championship standings

Note: Only the top five positions are included for both sets of standings.

References

Belgian Grand Prix
Belgian Grand Prix
Grand Prix
Sport in Walloon Brabant
Nivelles